Wreaths Across America is an American nonprofit organization established in 2007 by wreath producer Morrill Worcester, assisted by veterans and truckers.  Its primary activity is distributing Veteran's wreaths for placement on graves in military cemeteries.  In December 2008, the United States Senate agreed to a resolution that designated December 13, 2008, as Wreaths Across America Day.  Subsequent National Wreaths Across America Days have been designated on the second or third Saturday of December.

History
In 1992, the Worcester Wreath company in Harrington, Maine, had a surplus at the end of the Christmas holiday season. Recalling a boyhood trip to Arlington National Cemetery in Virginia, company founder Morrill Worcester donated to the cemetery 5,000 wreaths to honor the cemetery's dead, with the help of volunteers and a local trucking company. After thirteen years of similar donations, in 2005 a photo of snowy gravestones covered with wreaths at the cemetery received widespread circulation on the internet. Thousands of people called Worcester, wanting to replicate the wreath-laying service at their own veteran cemeteries.

At the end of 2006, Worcester's company supplied wreaths to over 230 state and national cemeteries and veterans monuments across the country. Over 150 different locations simultaneously held ceremonies with Arlington's. Additionally, the project had its first "Veterans Honor Parade" with "Patriot Guard Riders" who escorted the wreaths from Maine to the cemetery. The parade, which is held each year, now visits schools, monuments, veterans' homes and communities along its route.

Activities
In 2014, volunteers placed over 700,000 memorial wreaths at 1,000 locations in the United States and overseas, including the USS Arizona Memorial at Pearl Harbor, Bunker Hill, Valley Forge, and the National September 11 Memorial at the World Trade Center site in New York City. During that year, volunteers were able to place wreaths in all sections of Arlington Cemetery for the first time. In 2016, this number increased to 1.2 million wreaths being placed at more than 1,230 cemeteries across the nation.

Conflicts of interest
Conflict of interest charges have been made against Wreaths Across America because this charity has an exclusive for-profit supplier, Worcester Wreath Company, also run by the Morrill family in the same town. The charity's purchases of wreaths from this company account for most of the company's revenue and profits. In late 2015, The Wall Street Journal reported serious conflicts of interest with potential malfeasance in governance and contracting. In 2015 alone, the Journal reported profits of over $1 million on sales of over 850,000 wreaths to the charity raising concerns about competitive bidding, reporting that several competitors had asked to bid significantly below the price offered by Worcester Wreath company but were denied access. In 2016, Wreaths Across America, implemented a request for proposal process for the provision of wreaths which is managed by the board of directors. The organization has stated that they intend to address perceptions of conflict of interest by selecting an outside agency to manage the entire RFP process in 2023.

Flagpole of Freedom Park proposal
The project is separate from Wreaths Across America and is managed by Morrill, Rob, and Mike Worcester. While Morrill is the founder of both projects they are run by different management teams and governed independently of each other.

LeMessurier Consultants has been tasked with designing the structure. The size of the flag has been described as the size of one and a half American football fields.

The park is also slated to include 55 individual remembrance-wall parks carved with the names of every military veteran in US. history. The entry to the park is to be a faux-historical village known as Village of Old Glory, with museums, restaurants, shops, hotels and a live event venue.

Morrill Worcester's son Mike said that the for-profit park will not seek government funding and hopes to obtain private funding.

References 

Non-profit organizations based in Maine
Organizations established in 2007
2007 establishments in Maine
501(c)(3) organizations